The BOclassic is an annual road running competition over the distance of 10 kilometres for men and 5 kilometres for women. It is held on New Year's Eve in Bolzano, Italy. The competition has only elite races, competed between a limited number of runners, but over 10,000 spectators gather in the streets each year to witness the race. The race has been broadcast live on television by Italian channel Rai Sport Più.

It was first held in 1975 under the title Corsa Internazionale di San Silvestro – inspired by the Saint Silvester Road Race in Brazil, it was the first European New Year's Eve road race (Silvesterlauf). After nine editions as a 13 km race, the men's race settled on its 10 km format. A women's competition was included in the programme from 1977 onwards and it has been a 5 km race since 1987. The Corsa Internazionale di San Silvestro changed its name in 1996: race president Kurt Putzer renamed it the BOclassic.

The course is in the centre of the town of Bolzano. It is a looped circuit, starting at Walther Square and heading west on Via della Mostra before turning onto Via Goethe and Via del Portici. The route then heads southwards along Via Laurin before looping back on itself to follow along Vaile della Stazione back to the starting point.

Past male competitors have included multiple European champion Serhiy Lebid, Olympic marathon champion Stefano Baldini while women such as World Half Marathon Champions Tegla Loroupe and Berhane Adere have won the women's section. The 2011 edition featured three reigning world champions in Vivian Cheruiyot, Imane Merga and Wilson Kiprop.

Past winners
Key:

NB: The race course distances varied in the early years of the competition but the men's distance settled at 10 km from 1984 onwards and the women's race has been a 5K run since 1987.
2020 race distances: Men: 5 km, Women: 10k m

See also
Giro di Castelbuono
Memorial Peppe Greco

References
General
Past Winners. BOclassic. Retrieved on 2010-01-03.
Specific

External links
Official website

10K runs
5K runs
Athletics competitions in Italy
Recurring sporting events established in 1975
Sport in South Tyrol
Bolzano
Annual sporting events in Italy
1975 establishments in Italy
Winter events in Italy